The 2019–20 Abilene Christian Wildcats women's basketball team represented Abilene Christian University during the 2019–20 NCAA Division I women's basketball season. The Wildcats, led by eighth year head coach Julie Goodenough, played their home games at the Moody Coliseum as members of the Southland Conference. They finished the season 24–5, 16–4 in Southland play to finish in second place. Before they could play in the Southland women's tournament however, the tournament was cancelled due to the coronavirus pandemic.

Previous season
The Wildcats finished the season 23–10, 13–5 in Southland play to finish in fourth place. They won the Southland women's tournament to earn an automatic to the NCAA women's tournament for the first time in school history. They lost in the first round to Baylor.

Roster
Sources:

Schedule
Sources:

|-
!colspan=9 style=";"| Non-conference regular season

|-
!colspan=9 style=| Southland regular season

|-
!colspan=9 style=| Non-conference regular season

|-
!colspan=9 style=| Southland regular season

|-
!colspan=12 style=| 2020 Hercules TiresSouthland Basketball Tournament
|-

See also
 2019–20 Abilene Christian Wildcats men's basketball team

References

Abilene Christian Wildcats women's basketball seasons
Abilene Christian
Abilene Christian
Abilene Christian